Aegialia is a genus of aphodiine dung beetles in the family Scarabaeidae.

Selected species

 Aegialia amplipunctata Gordon and Cartwright, 1988 i c g
 Aegialia arenaria (Fabricius, 1787) i c g b
 Aegialia blanchardi Horn, 1887 i c g b
 Aegialia carri Gordon and Cartwright, 1988 i c g
 Aegialia cartwrighti Stebnicka, 1977 i c g b
 Aegialia clypeata (Say, 1824) c g
 Aegialia concinna Gordon & Cartwright, 1977 i c g b (ciervo aegialian scarab)
 Aegialia conferta Horn, 1871 i c g b
 Aegialia convexa Fall, 1932 i c g b
 Aegialia crassa LeConte, 1857 i c g
 Aegialia crescenta Gordon & Cartwright, 1977 i c g b (crescent dunes aegialian scarab)
 Aegialia criddlei Brown, 1931 i g
 Aegialia cylindrica (Eschscholtz, 1822) i
 Aegialia exarata Mannerheim, 1853 i g
 Aegialia hardyi Gordon and Cartwright, 1977 i c g
 Aegialia kelsoi Gordon and Cartwright, 1988 i c g
 Aegialia knighti Gordon and Rust, 1997 i c g
 Aegialia lacustris Leconte, 1850 i g b
 Aegialia latispina Leconte, 1878 i c g b
 Aegialia magnifica Gordon and Cartwright, 1977 i c g
 Aegialia mcclevei Gordon, 1990 i c g
 Aegialia nana Brown, 1931 i g
 Aegialia nigrella Brown, 1931 i g
 Aegialia nitida Waterhouse, 1875 c g
 Aegialia opaca Brown, 1931 i g
 Aegialia opifex Horn, 1887 i c g b
 Aegialia punctata Brown, 1931 i c g
 Aegialia rupta Scudder, 1890 c g
 Aegialia shimeki Lago & Freese, 2016 c g
 Aegialia spinosa Gordon & Cartwright, 1988 i c g b
 Aegialia terminalis Brown, 1931 i g

Data sources: i = ITIS, c = Catalogue of Life, g = GBIF, b = Bugguide.net

See also
Queen consort of Diomedes, Aegialia of ancient Argos

References

Scarabaeidae genera
Taxonomy articles created by Polbot